The Louis Baronetcy, of Chelston in the County of Devon, was a title in the Baronetage of the United Kingdom. It was created on 1 April 1806 to reward the service of Admiral Thomas Louis at the Battle of San Domingo in 1806. It passed to his son John Louis, later an admiral himself, on his death the following year and remained extant until the death of the fifth Baronet, Sir Charles Louis, in 1949.

Louis baronets, of Chelston (1806)
Sir Thomas Louis, 1st Baronet (1758–1807)
Sir John Louis, 2nd Baronet (1785–1863)
Sir John Louis, 3rd Baronet (1832–1893)
Sir Charles Louis, 4th Baronet (1813–1900)
Sir Charles Louis, 5th Baronet (1859–1949)

Sources
 

Extinct baronetcies in the Baronetage of the United Kingdom